Kent Shocknek is an American television and film personality who branched into acting toward the end of a successful career as a TV  newscaster. Because of the length of his journalism career, duration of his broadcasts, and breaking news events, by the time of his departure from news, he is credited with having logged more hours as an anchor than anyone else in Los Angeles. The city has designated two separate days "Kent Shocknek Day" in his honor. Before anchoring prime-time newscasts on CBS-TV owned stations, Shocknek was Southern California's first and longest-running television news morning news anchor. Because of his recognizability, he has been sought out to appear in more than 100 feature films and television dramas –often as a newscaster or commentator –giving rise to a popular second career that continues currently. On radio, Shocknek has narrated daily commentaries in L.A., and has hosted a nationally syndicated entertainment program. Viewers and magazine readers also recognize him as an authority on automotive issues.

Career
Born Kent Schoknecht in Berkeley, California, he simplified the on-air spelling of his name upon arrival to Los Angeles television. After working at the Long Beach Press Telegram while attending the University of Southern California, Shocknek's first TV reporting job was in Sioux City, Iowa (KCAU-TV), followed by a three-year stint as anchor and Space Shuttle reporter in Orlando, Florida (WFTV).

In 1983, Shocknek joined KNBC-TV as a reporter and fill-in anchor for what was then known as News4LA.  Three years later, he anchored the start-up of L.A.'s first TV morning news program, Today in LA (originally known as L.A. Today) on KNBC-TV. Over the years, he broadcast —frequently  single-handedly— such marathon events as the Los Angeles riots, O.J. Simpson murder trial, and numerous natural disasters.

Shocknek first made national news headlines anchoring the 1986 launch and explosion of Space Shuttle Challenger; and a strong aftershock to the deadly 5.9 1987 Whittier Narrows earthquake. The threat of falling studio lights forced Shocknek to take cover under his set's desk for several seconds as he continued reporting about the ground- and studio movement.

After helming the consistently top-rated KNBC program for 15 years, Shocknek moved to KCBS-TV and began anchoring the morning editions of CBS 2 News in 2001. There, L.A. Confidential magazine named him one of L.A.'s top three anchors. He anchored live the September 11 attack on the World Trade Center, and subsequently reported live on the War in Iraq, Michael Jackson's funeral, presidential inaugurations; plus Southern California's seasonal wildfires and frequent high-speed freeway chases. In November 2013, Shocknek and his popular morning coanchor Suzie Suh moved to prime-time spots on Los Angeles CBS TV-owned station KCAL-TV, anchoring #1-rated newscasts, KCAL 9 News at 8 pm and 10 pm. In a move that surprised viewers, he retired from newscasting in late 2014. Shocknek's final newscast —including a 10-minute career retrospective and farewell video featuring L.A. newsmakers and Hollywood celebrities— aired September 26, 2014. Various local governments and agencies, including the City and County of Los Angeles, as well as the State of California, have honored him for his work.

Shortly after Shocknek retired from news anchoring, the short film "The 6 O'Clock" premiered, starring Shocknek as the male lead in the role of a highly focused individual. He has acted in more than 100 major Hollywood film & TV productions, working for directors Steven Spielberg, Adam McKay in Anchorman: The Legend of Ron Burgundy, Barry Levinson, and Justin Lin, among others. In television, Shocknek has marked more than a dozen appearances as newsman "Guy Ross" in the crime procedural drama NCIS and its spin-off series, NCIS: Los Angeles. He also has held recurring roles in Criminal Minds, and the Amazon series, Bosch.

Shocknek's voice is almost as well known as his image; he began writing and delivering the 60-second daily radio commentary Just A Minute with Kent Shocknek on CBS all-news radio station KNX-1070 AM in Los Angeles, in 2003. Later, he launched Premiere Magazine Live!, a weekly national radio show about movies, in approximately 50 markets countrywide, with his wife Karen, using the on-air surname Walters, working as co-host.

Filmography

Awards
8 regional Emmy Awards (individual and group)
2 L.A. Press Club Awards
Golden Mic. Award (Best Daytime Newscast)
Wm. Randolph Hearst Award (investigative reporting)

Education
B.A., University of Southern California, magna cum laude, Phi Beta Kappa

References

External links

CBSLA.com website Shocknek bio 
Kent Shocknek website

Living people
Television anchors from Los Angeles
University of Southern California alumni
Year of birth missing (living people)